Benjamin Isović (born 9 September 1962) is a Bosnian singer-songwriter and poet. His late father, Safet Isović, is remembered as one of the most influential Sevdalinka singers of all time.

Career
In 2008, when the Republika Srpska was looking for entries for a new regional anthem, Isovic and Bosnian national anthem composer Dušan Šestić submitted an entry, "Мајко земљо" ("Mother Earth") as a contender, though ultimately it was not chosen. In the late 2000s, Šestić and Isović also wrote a set of lyrics for the at the time and still wordless Bosnian national anthem, although they were not adopted.

Discography

Vocals
Male priče o velikim ljubavima (1989)
Male priče o Pišonji i Žugi (2004)
Za njom plaću crne oči (1993)
Obriši suze baksuze (1994)
Nije čudo što te volim ludo (1999)
Ostarit ćemo (2000)
Prezime (2002)
Zbog ljubavi (2005)
I ovako i onako (2007)
Mi smo divovi (2009)
Poljubi me (2009) ft. Sabrina
Ponovo se volimo (2011)

Instruments and performance
Bosnian Music 16 CD (Bosanskohercegovačko Muzičko Naslijeđe – Bosnian Music Heritage)  (2010)

Writing and arrangement
Boris I Noćna Straža – Obojeni Snovi (1989)
Boris* – The Best Of (1995)
Safet Isović – Šehidski Rastanak  (1996)
Bona Ne Bila (1996)
Legenda O Bosni – Legend Of Bosnia (2003)
Što Je S Princezom Moje Vrele Mladosti (U Tvojim Očima) (2003)

References 

1969 births
Bosniaks of Bosnia and Herzegovina
Sevdalinka
20th-century Bosnia and Herzegovina male singers
21st-century Bosnia and Herzegovina male singers
Musicians from Sarajevo
Living people
National anthem writers